George Brodie may refer to:

George Brodie of Ailisk, Member of the Parliament of Scotland for Elginshire and Forres
George Brodie (New Zealand politician), 19th century Member of Parliament in New Zealand
George Brodie (historian) (1786–1867), Scottish historian
George Brodie (footballer) (1898–1982), Scottish footballer for Notts County and Wigan Borough